The Filmfare Best Lyricist Award is given by the Filmfare magazine as part of its annual Filmfare Awards South for Malayalam films.

Superlatives

References

External links

Lyricist